Pattiseema is a village in Polavaram mandal of East Godavari district, Andhra Pradesh, India. It is located on the bank of the River Godavari. It is a site of historical importance for Hindus. Famous temple named Sri Veerabhadra Swamy Temple is picturesquely located on a hillock known as Devakuta Parvatha located on an island in the midst of Godavari River. Pattiseema has a railway junction connecting major cities.

Demographics 

 Census of India, Pattiseema had a population of 4792. The total population constitute, 2382 males and 2410 females with a sex ratio of 1012 females per 1000 males. 424 children are in the age group of 0–6 years, with sex ratio of 991 The average literacy rate stands at 68.83%.

Temple 

The temple houses a life-size statue of Devi Bhadrakali which is decorated with heavy ornaments and a sword. It is known as one of the Panchakasi Kshetrams of the Shaivaites.

Transport 

AP TDC runs bus services from Rajahmundry to this village. The temple can be only be accessed through boats run by APTDC.

References

Villages in West Godavari district